The Draconians are a fictional extraterrestrial race from the planet Draconia. They were featured in the British science fiction television series Doctor Who. Their only television appearance to date was in the 1973 serial Frontier in Space. Unlike many "monster" races in Doctor Who, the Draconians were articulate and portrayed as having a sophisticated and advanced culture like feudal Japan. In his 1996 memoir of his time on Doctor Who, written just before his death, actor Jon Pertwee cited the Draconians as his favourite of all the monsters he had encountered during his time as the Third Doctor.

Appearances

Television 
In Frontier in Space (1973), the sole television appearance of the Draconians, the time traveller the Master escalates war between the humans and the Draconians' galactic empires in the 26th century, by using a sonic hypnosis device to make the human crews see the Ogron mercenaries as Draconians and the Draconian crews see them as humans. The Master allies himself with the Daleks, who launch another bid for galactic conquest and hope to pick up the pieces after the war. The plot is revealed by the time traveller the Third Doctor, and instead of going to war against each other, the two empires unite against the Daleks.

Backstory in the serial mentions that the Doctor had dealt with a space plague 500 years before the serial, causing him to be made a noble of Draconia by the 15th Emperor. 20 years before the serial, the human General Williams is mentioned as having triggered war between humans and Draconians after seeing an unarmed battlecruiser on a peace mission whose communications device wrecked by a neutron storm and was thus unable to respond to Williams. Williams had incorrectly assumed that the battlecruiser was hostile and about to fire on his own damaged ship.

In the Doctor Who episode "The Satan Pit" (2006), the Tenth Doctor says that Draconia, in common with other planets, has myths of a horned beast being the ultimate embodiment of evil.

The Draconians are mentioned in The Sarah Jane Adventures serial Secrets of the Stars (2008). The Draconians are said to have their own celestial zodiac.

River Song mentions the Draconians in the Doctor Who episode "The Pandorica Opens" (2010).

In "The Time of the Doctor" (2013), the town of Christmas' children surround the Eleventh Doctor showing him pictures of his countless "victories" on Trenzalore. The Doctor points out one image and responds, "That's me arm-wrestling a Draconian. I remember that."

Other appearances 
In addition to Frontier in Space, the Draconians have appeared in spin-off media, including comics, novels and audio plays, in which they were players in the galactic politics surrounding the Earth Empire period of human history. The Draconians also featured in Reeltime Pictures' Mindgame video series, and are a major presence in the Bernice Summerfield audio adventures and books, including The Draconian Rage. In 2007, a Draconian ambassador called Kothar became a regular character in the Bernice Summerfield range. He made his first appearance in The Judas Gift. They meet the Sixth Doctor in the audio story Paper Cuts.

The Virgin New Adventures novel Love and War by Paul Cornell mentions that the Draconians call the Doctor "Karshtakavaar", or "The Oncoming Storm".

"Draconian space" is mentioned in the New Series Adventure The Price of Paradise.

In IDW Doctor Who comic "Fugitive" the Tenth Doctor meets the Draconian diplomat Kraden, who is on his way to peace talks but was arrested on false charges. He, along with the Sontaran Stomm and Ogron Brarshak, helps the Doctor.

In Prisoner of the Daleks, set during a Dalek War with humanity during the 26th century, it is mentioned that Space Major Jon Bowman is a veteran of the Draconian Wars.

References

External links
 

Doctor Who races
Fictional reptilians